The Subversive Kind is the eleventh studio album released by the metal band, Deliverance. The album was originally not going to happen, as the band had announced back in 2013 that Hear What I Say! would be the final release.

However, Jimmy P. Brown was contacted by George Ochoa, who stated the band should reunite. Brown and Ochoa added Victor Macias (Tourniquet) and Jim Chaffin, and the band went out to perform at Exodo Fest in 2016, alongside Abated Mass of Flesh and Silent Planet. The festival was a big part of why the band decided to reunite, as the band enjoyed performing together. The band would then hire Greg Minier (The Crucified) to record solos for the album, but then added former Deliverance member Glenn Rogers to perform on the album.

Track listing

Personnel 

Deliverance
 Jimmy P. Brown – vocals, rhythm guitars, engineer, mixing, producer
 Glenn Rogers – lead guitars
 Victor Macias – bass guitar
 Jim Chaffin – drums, producer

Additional musicians
 Greg Minier – lead guitars

Production
 Rob Colwell – mastering
 Scott Waters – layout and design
 Robert Scott – cover art

References

Deliverance (metal band) albums
2018 albums